Pallacanestro Femminile Umbertide, better known as PF Umbertide, is an Italian women's basketball team from the town of Umbertide.

Since 2008 to 2017 the team played in the first League (Serie A1). After the 2017–18 season, the team decided to join the A2 League (Serie A2).

Club 
  Dott. Paolo Betti - President
  Francesca Fondacci - Secretary
  Francesco Cucchiarini – Press agent
  Salvatore Fioretto – Logistics
  Cristian Marconi – Logistics

Staff 
  Alessandro Contu - Head coach
  Katalin Honti - Assistant Coach
  Michele Crispoltoni - Assistant Coach
  Simone Tosti - Assistant Coach
  Gianluca Carboni - Athletic trainer
  Andrea Raschi - Physioterapist
  Filippo Mariotti- Physioterapist
  Lucia Pigliapoco – Physioterapist
  Valerio Mencagli – Statistics
  Dott. Carlo Tramontana – Doctor

Supporters

PF Umbertide has a group of supporters named Supporters Fratta

Mascotte

PF Umbertide
Basketball teams established in 2008